Maa-alused are, in Estonian folk religion, mysterious elf-like creatures which live beneath the ground. They were believed to have a parallel existence to that of humans, the principal differences being that all orientations are reversed, such that up becomes down and left becomes right, and that all things possessed by them are diminished in size.

External links 
Page on maa-alused and folklore (in Estonian)

References

Estonian legendary creatures